Adamsville is a ghost town in the town of Ridgeway, Iowa County, Wisconsin, United States. Adamsville was founded by the politician John Adams and was the birthplace of his son Alva Adams, who served as the governor of Colorado.

References

Geography of Iowa County, Wisconsin
Ghost towns in Wisconsin